Edwin H. Meihofer (December 24, 1907 – January 14, 2003) was an American labor union activist and politician.

Meihofer was born in Saint Paul, Minnesota. He lived in Saint Paul, Minnesota with his wife and family and was involved with the Individual Truck Owners Union. Meihofer served in the Minnesota House of Representatives from 1945 to 1950 and waas a Democrat.

References

1907 births
2003 deaths
Politicians from Saint Paul, Minnesota
Trade unionists from Minnesota
Democratic Party members of the Minnesota House of Representatives